Andrei Szilard or Elek Szilárd (1914 – 26 June 1980) was a Romanian-Hungarian footballer who played as a striker.

International career
Andrei Szilard played one game for Romania on 25 August 1935 under coach Constantin Rădulescu in a friendly against Germany which ended with a 4–2 loss.

References

External links
 

1914 births
1980 deaths
Romanian footballers
Hungarian footballers
Romania international footballers
Association football forwards
Liga I players
Chinezul Timișoara players
FC CFR Timișoara players
Nemzeti Bajnokság I players
Debreceni VSC players